RNLB Emma Constance (ON 693) was a Barnett-class lifeboat stationed at Aberdeen Lifeboat Station, in the Scottish city of Aberdeen from 1927 until August 1951. The lifeboat was designed by James R. Barnett who was a consulting naval architect to the Royal National Lifeboat Institution (RNLI).

Description 
At 61 feet long and 15 feet wide, the Emma Constance was a large lifeboat, and was one of only four Barnett-class lifeboats at this size. She had a draught of over 4 feet. When built, the Emma Constance and her sisters-in-class were the largest lifeboats in the RNLI fleet; only the 70-foot Clyde-class lifeboats built in the 1960s have been larger.

The Emma Constance was laid down in 1926 in the yards of Saunders Roe of East Cowes on the Isle of Wight. A total of fourteen watertight compartments made up the boat's hull. She was propelled by twin screws powered by twin RNLI DE6 petrol engines, each of which was housed in its own watertight compartment. Three separate fuel tanks at the rear of the engine compartments carried a fuel load of up to 500 gallons altogether. An auxiliary petrol engine powered a generator for the windlass at the front of the boat and a capstan at the back of the boat.

The Emma Constance carried a full set of sails in case of power loss, and a jumping net that could be set up to allow rescuees to jump down from their own ship and be hauled up to the lifeboat.

History

Pre-christening rescues 
The Emma Constance was first called out for service first service on 21 July 1927 to aid a trawler called Venetia which had run aground at Girdleness, although on arrival her assistance was not needed.

On 6 September that year she launched to her second service, in aid of the trawler Ben Torc, which had run into rough seas and dense fog off of Gregness Point near Aberdeen harbour. By 10 pm, heavy waves were battering the ship, and the skipper sounded the distress sirens. Coastguards manning Gregness station had climbed down the cliffs to the scene and managed, with great difficulty, to get a lifeline across to the trawler, but the trawler's crew preferred to wait for a lifeboat than risk the climb. At 10:27 pm the Emma Constance launched, and by the time of her arrival the Ben Torc was aground on a rocky outcrop called Gregness Point. The lifeboat carefully threaded the rocky waters to pull up to the Ben Torc. Five of the six crew jumped aboard, but the skipper fell into the sea and had to be hauled aboard by line. Fortunately, he was uninjured, and to the amusement of all present, his bowler hat had remained firmly on his head despite his misadventure. By midnight, Emma Constance had brought all six crewmen back to Aberdeen.

The Emma Constance was formally christened on 19 September 1927 in front of a crowd of 10,000–12,000 people. The bandsmen of the 4th Gordon Highlanders provided music, and Maud Carnegie, Countess of Southesk, performed the naming ceremony.

Trawler George Stroud 
In the evening of 25 December 1935, Emma Constance launched to assist Aberdeen trawler George Stroud, who had been struck by an up-swell that knocked her against the wall of the North Pier at Aberdeen harbour, then battered further until she ran aground 200 yards from the seaward side of the pier. Members of the Royal Life Saving Society on the shore used rockets to attach lifelines to the George Stroud, but her crew of five men, sheltering in the wheelhouse, refused to attempt the climb and called for a lifeboat rescue. On arrival, the Emma Constance was positioned between the pier and the trawler. Only one crewman managed to get to the lifeboat before heavy waves dashed the lifeboat against the pier, damaging her and destroying the trawler's wheelhouse. One crewman was spotted in the sea but drowned before he could be rescued, while the Lifesavers working on shore managed to save another. Ultimately only two of the five crewmen were saved. The Emma Constance coxswain was awarded an RNLI Bronze Medal for his part in the rescue.

SS Fairy 
From the 23rd to the 27th of January 1937, Scotland's east coast was battered by a forceful gale. The Fairy, a 249-ton collier (coal-bearing cargo ship), arrived at Aberdeen harbour on 24 January, only to discover the port closed due to the extremely rough waves. By the 25th, the Fairy had been driven 30 miles offshore and was filling with seawater. The captain declared an emergency and directed the crew to bail. He managed to take the ship to within nine miles of shore, where he signalled German trawler Hendrick for a tow. The pair made it to a point just off Donmouth by 4:30 pm, where they launched flares. Emma Constance launched to assist, but the captain of the Fairy wished to continue the tow rather than abandon his ship, so the Emma  Constance stood by. After several hours of slow progress, the towline snapped and could not be reattached. At 10 pm the Fairy ran aground and was swamped by waves, as was the Emma Constance when she tried to approach. On a second approach, the lifeboat managed to rescue all seven of the Fairy's crewmen, but due to the rough seas were forced to make for Moray Firth rather than returning to Aberdeen. Badly damaged, they arrived at Moray Firth on 27 January at 4:30 pm. Crew members were awarded RNLI Medals in Silver and Bronze.

Retirement 
On 14 January 1951 Emma Constance performed her last launch. She went to assist the yawl Glen of Aberdeen which had broken down 1 nautical mile east-north-east of Gregness. The lifeboat took the vessel into tow and returned to Aberdeen. In August 1951 the Emma Constance was retired from Aberdeen. Her replacement was a 52 ft Barnett-class lifeboat called . Following her retirement the Emma Constance was sold out of the RNLI fleet and was renamed several times becoming first the Southern Cross followed by Achilleus and then Griselda.

Record of service and rescues

References 

Aberdeen lifeboats
Barnett-class lifeboats
1927 ships